The Journal of Orthopaedic Trauma is a monthly, peer-reviewed, orthopaedic journal published by Lippincott Williams & Wilkins. It was established in 1987. The editor in chief is Roy W. Sanders.

This journal is the official publication of the Orthopaedic Trauma Association, International Society for Fracture Repair, Belgian Orthopaedic Trauma Association, Japan Fracture Society, and the Canadian Orthopaedic Trauma Society.

Aims and scope
Topical coverage includes hard and soft tissue trauma, pertaining to the following types of injuries: ligament, bone, muscle, spinal cord, and tendons. Diagnoses and management of these injuries is also covered. Furthermore, methods and tools are covered such as advancements in surgical instruments, effective diagnostics, and advancements in surgical procedures. Prostheses and implants are also covered by this journal, as well as bioplastics and biometals, physical therapy, and rehabilitation.

Highly cited articles

Abstracting and indexing
The journal is abstracted and indexed in the following databases:
 
 Science Citation Index 
 SciSearch
 Current Contents/Clinical Medicine
 Index Medicus 
 MEDLINE 
 PubMed

References

Orthopedics journals
Publications established in 1987
Lippincott Williams & Wilkins academic journals
Monthly journals
English-language journals